Marchantiopsida is a class of liverworts within the phylum Marchantiophyta. The species in this class are known as complex thalloid liverworts. The species in this class are widely distributed and can be found worldwide.

Taxonomy
 Blasiidae He-Nygrén et al. 2006
 Blasiales Stotl. & Crand.-Stotl. 2000
 Blasiaceae H.Klinggr. 1858
 †Treubiitaceae Schuster 1980
 Marchantiidae Engl. 1893 sensu He-Nygrén et al. 2006
 Lunulariales H.Klinggr. 2006
 Lunulariaceae H.Klinggr. 1858
 Marchantiales Limpr. 1877 (complex thalloids)
 Aytoniaceae Cavers 1911  [Rebouliaceae; Grimaldiaceae]
 Cleveaceae Cavers 1911  [Sauteriaceae]
 Conocephalaceae Müll.Frib. ex Grolle 1972
 Corsiniaceae Engl. 1892
 Cyathodiaceae Stotler & Crand.-Stotl. 2000
 Dumortieraceae Long 2006 
 Exormothecaceae Müll.Frib. ex Grolle 1972
 Marchantiaceae Lindl. 1836
 Monocleaceae A.B.Frank 1877  
 Monosoleniaceae Inoue 1966 
 Oxymitraceae Müll.Frib. ex Grolle 1972 
 Ricciaceae Rchb. 1828 
 Targioniaceae Dumort. 1829 
 Wiesnerellaceae Inoue 1976 
 Neohodgsoniales D.G.Long 2006
 Neohodgsoniaceae D.G.Long 2006
 Sphaerocarpales Cavers 1910 (bottle liverworts)
 Monocarpaceae D.J.Carr ex Schelpe 1969
 Riellaceae Engl. 1892
 Sphaerocarpaceae Heeg 1891

Phylogeny

See also 
 Marchantiophyta

References 

Liverworts
Plant classes